The 2020–21 America East Conference men's basketball season began with practices in October 2020, followed by the start of the 2020–21 NCAA Division I men's basketball season in November 2020. Conference play began in December and concluded with the 2021 America East men's basketball tournament. The America East expanded from 9 teams to 10 with the arrival of NJIT on July 1, 2020.

Preseason 
The America East announced its preseason honors and polls on November 11, 2020.

Preseason Poll

Preseason All-Conference Team

Regular season

Conference matrix
This table summarizes the head-to-head results between teams in conference play. Each team is scheduled to play all other conference teams twice.

Postseason

America East tournament 
The 2021 America East men's basketball tournament took place following the end of the conference regular season.

NCAA tournament

National Invitation tournament

References